The Charles Ramsay Trophy has been awarded since 1978 to the top scorer in the Ligue Magnus. It is named after American player Charles Ramsay, a French league star in the 1930s, and the captain of the first United States World Championship squad.

Winners

External links
 Fédération Française de Hockey sur Glace

Ligue Magnus
Ice hockey trophies and awards
French awards
Scoring (ice hockey)